Pris or PRIS may refer to:

 Pris (band), a side project of American musician Burke Thomas
 Peace Region Internet Society, in Canada
 Power Rangers in Space, an American television series
 Propofol infusion syndrome
 Pris Stratton, a character in Philip K. Dick's novel Do Androids Dream of Electric Sheep?
 Pris Stratton, a character in the film Blade Runner played by Daryl Hannah

See also
 PRI (disambiguation)